Taraneh is an Iranian feminine given name meaning "melody", or “song”.

People named Taraneh include:
 Taraneh Alidoosti (born 1984), Iranian actress
 Taraneh Boroumand, Iranian playwright, writer, poet, and translator
 Taraneh Hemami (born 1960), Iranian-born American visual artist
 Taraneh Javanbakht (born 1974), Iranian scientist and polymath
 Taraneh Mousavi (1981–2009), Iranian abuse victim

Persian feminine given names